Empire: Original Soundtrack Season 2 Volume 1 is the second soundtrack album by the cast of the musical drama television series Empire which airs on Fox. The album includes songs that featured during the second season of the show. It was released on November 20, 2015.

Commercial Performance
The album debuted at No. 16 on the Billboard 200, selling 22,000 copies in the first week. As of April 2016, the album has sold 114,000 copies in the US.

Critical response
AllMusic gave the album a score of three out of five, commenting that "much like the show itself, the quality of songs has become somewhat uneven" and that the album's standout track is "Boom Boom Boom Boom". Entertainment Focus gave the album four out of five stars, based on the deluxe version of the album. They felt that eight bonus tracks were the best on the album.

Track listing

Personnel

Executive music producer
Timbaland
Soundtrack album producers
Timbaland
Ne-Yo
J.R. Rotem
Teal Douville
Swizz Beatz
Thomas "Da Hitman" Goodlett
Music supervisor
Jen Ross (Format Entertainment)
Executive in charge of music for 20th Century Fox Television
Geoff Bywater
Executive in charge of music for Columbia
Shawn Holiday
Music coordinator
Simone Sheffield 
Music production for Fox
Carol Farhat
Music production liaison
Robin Simms

Soundtrack coordination
Nicole Fox
Sebastien LeTellier
Periscope Studio manager
Michael Nels
Mastered by
Mark Santangelo
Dave Kutch
Art direction and design
Dave Bett
Taylor Diglio
Executive producers
Brian Grazer
Francie Calfo
Danny Strong
Lee Daniels
Ilene Chaiken

Charts

Weekly charts

Year-end charts

References

2015 soundtrack albums
Columbia Records soundtracks
Empire (2015 TV series)
Albums produced by Timbaland
Television soundtracks
Albums produced by J. R. Rotem
Albums produced by Swizz Beatz
Albums produced by Ne-Yo